Zul, ZUL or variations thereof may refer to:

People
 Zul Kifl Salami, politician and economist from Benin
 Zul Yusri Che Harun (born 1986), Malaysian footballer
 Zul Sutan (1957–2018), Singaporean singer and guitarist
 Damdingiin Zul (born 1973), Mongolian boxer

Other uses
 Zul, South Khorasan, Iran, a village
 Zürcher Unterländer or ZUL, a Swiss German-language daily newspaper
 Z.u.L., a free, open source geometry app
 Zul, a dialect of the Polci language, spoken in Nigeria
 zul, ISO 639-2 and -3 code for the Zulu language, spoken in Southern Africa
 Zul, the Kalmyk New Year - see Burkhan Bakshin Altan Sume

Masculine given names